Prakash Jha (born 27 February 1952) is an Indian film producer, actor, director and screenwriter, mostly known for his political and socio-political films such as “Hip Hip Hurray” (1984), Damul (1984), Mrityudand (1997), Gangaajal (2003), Apaharan (2005), including multi-starrer movies like Raajneeti (2010), Aarakshan (2011) Chakravyuh (2012), and Satyagraha (2013), Dirty Politics (2015 ). He is also the maker of National Film Award winning documentaries like, Faces After The Storm (1984) and Sonal (2002).

He runs a production company, Prakash Jha Productions. He also owns the P&M Mall in Patna and the P&M Hi-Tech City Centre Mall in Jamshedpur.

Biography

Early life and education
Prakash Jha was raised at his family's farm in Barharwa, Bettiah, West Champaran, Bihar, India. His father's name is Shri Tej Nath Jha. He did his schooling from  Sainik School Tilaya, Koderma district and Kendriya Vidyalaya No. 1, Bokaro Steel City, Jharkhand. Later, he joined Ramjas College, Delhi University to do BSc (Hons) in Physics, though he left his studies after one year, and decided to go to Bombay (present-day Mumbai) and become a painter. While he was preparing for J.J. School of Arts, he happened to witness the shooting of the film Dharma and got hooked on filmmaking. He graduated from KC College, Mumbai

He joined the Film and Television Institute of India (FTII), Pune in 1973, to do a course in editing. Midway through it, the institution was closed for while due to student agitation, so he came to Bombay, started working, and never went back to complete the course.

Personal life
Prakash was at one time married to actress Deepti Naval with whom he has an adopted daughter Disha Jha.

Career

While still midway through his course, he started working on films independently in 1974. He made his first documentary, Under the Blue, in 1975, and continued to do so for the next eight years.

During this period he made some highly politically charged documentaries, like the one of the Bihar Sharif riot, titled, Faces After Storm (1984). It received considerable attention, as it was banned within 4–5 days of its release, though later it won the National Film Award for Best Non-Feature Film for the year.

He made his debut as a feature film director with Hip Hip Hurray in 1984, scripted by Gulzar and starring Raj Kiran and Deepti Naval as leads. Next came the film he received most recognition for, Damul (1984), which won the National Film Award for Best Feature Film and the Filmfare Critics Award for Best Movie in 1985. The film was based on the bonded labour issue in Bihar.

In 1986, he directed Parinati, based on the story by Vijaydan Detha.

Over the years he has made over 25 documentaries, 13 feature films, two television features and three television series, including the popular TV serial Mungerilal Ke Hasin Sapne. His production company has produced five films with independent directors.

In 2004, Jha directed the 112-minute film Loknayak, based on the life of Bharat Ratna Jayaprakash Narayan. In the film, Chetan Pandit played the role of Narayan and Tisca Chopra played Prabhavati Devi, the wife of JP.

In 2010, Jha directed Raajneeti, a contemporary take on the epic Mahabharata. It starred Ajay Devgan, Manoj Bajpai, Naseeruddin Shah, Katrina Kaif, Arjun Rampal, Nana Patekar and Ranbir Kapoor, and was a critical and commercial success. His next venture was Aarakshan, which starred Amitabh Bachchan, Saif Ali Khan Deepika Padukone and Prateik Babbar. In 2012, Jha's release Chakravyuh starred Arjun Rampal, Abhay Deol, Manoj Bajpai, Kabir Bedi and Esha Gupta, and was released in Dussehra 2012. His next film Satyagraha (2013) starred Amitabh Bachchan and Ajay Devgn.

In 2019, he acted in the film Saand Ki Aankh a biographical film directed by Tushar Hiranandani. He played Rattan Singh Tomar, the patriarch of the Tomar family.

Politics
Prakash Jha contested and lost the 14th Lok Sabha election from his native place Bettiah in 2004. He stood 6th and managed to get around 26,000 votes only, while the winner Raghunath Jha got 2,11,590 votes. He also lost the 15th Lok Sabha election to Sanjay Jaiswal in 2009 as Lok Janshakti Party (LJP) candidate from Paschim Champaran. In the same election Sadhu Yadav stood 3rd as INC candidate. 

Jha once again contested in the 16th Lok Sabha election in 2014 as a Janata Dal (United) candidate from Paschim Champaran and lost to Sanjay Jaiswal. In 2014 election affidavit he had mentioned that he has assets worth ₹92.5 crores and liabilities worth ₹55.2 crores.

Social initiatives
For the last ten years Prakash Jha has been seriously involved with development initiatives in Bihar. He has been spearheading growth in infrastructure, health care and vocational training facilities in the state through the NGO Anubhooti.

Anubhooti
Prakash Jha is the chairman of Anubhooti, a registered society that has been working for cultural development, improvement of health care, disaster management and the upliftment of farmers and socio-economically backward people in Bihar since 1991.

Most recently, the organization has been working for flood survivors. After the Kosi flood on 18 August 2008, Anubhooti has provided complete relief to 6000 people since September 2008. Anubhooti has created a model village, Hindolwa village, for those the flood affected, and is working towards their complete rehabilitation. Anubhooti has provided relief to 5000 people for health care in Supaul district in Bihar.

Filmography

Awards

National Film Awards
 1984: National Film Award for Best Non-Feature Film: Faces After The Storm (1984)
 1985: National Film Award for Best Feature Film: Damul (1985)
 1987: National Film Award for Best Arts/Cultural Film: Kudiattam
 1988: National Film Award for Best Costume Design: Parinati
 1988: National Film Award for Best Industrial Documentary: Looking Back
 2002: National Film Award for Best Non-Feature Film: Sonal
 2004: National Film Award for Best Film on Other Social Issues: Gangaajal (2003)
 2006: National Film Award for Best Screenplay: Apaharan  (2005)

Filmfare Awards
 2001: Best Documentary of the year: Faces After The Storm (1983)
 1985: Filmfare Critics Award for Best Movie: Damul (1985)
 2006:Filmfare Best Dialogue Award: Apaharan  (2005)

Star Screen Awards
2005: Star Screen Best Screenplay Award: Apaharan
2011: Star Screen Best Screenplay Award: Raajneeti

Filmfare OTT Awards

ITA Awards

References

External links

 
 
 

1952 births
Living people
Film directors from Mumbai
Film and Television Institute of India alumni
Delhi University alumni
20th-century Indian film directors
Indian documentary filmmakers
Hindi-language film directors
Film producers from Mumbai
Indian male screenwriters
Filmfare Awards winners
Kendriya Vidyalaya alumni
Sainik School alumni
People from West Champaran district
Candidates in the 2014 Indian general election
Janata Dal (United) politicians
Lok Janshakti Party politicians
21st-century Indian film directors
Politicians from Mumbai
Hindi film editors
Film editors from Bihar
Film producers from Bihar
Film directors from Bihar
Best Original Screenplay National Film Award winners
Directors who won the Best Feature Film National Film Award
Producers who won the Best Film on Other Social Issues National Film Award
Directors who won the Best Film on Other Social Issues National Film Award
Screenwriters from Bihar
Male actors from Bihar
Ramjas College alumni